Kelly Kovski (born June 16, 1981) is an American professional racing driver and crew chief. He has competed in the ARCA Menards Series for eighteen years, primarily racing at the Illinois State Fairgrounds and DuQuoin State Fairgrounds. He has also competed in and won at various dirt track events alongside his starts in ARCA competition.

Racing career
Kovski would make his ARCA Re/Max Series debut in 2004 driving for Fast Track Racing at the DuQuoin State Fairgrounds Racetrack in the No. 10 Chevrolet, where he would finish 15th, a lap down behind race winner Frank Kimmel.

From 2005 to 2011, Kovski would primarily run the dirt races with his own team in collaboration with Roulo Brothers Racing in the No. 39 Chevrolet. In 2005, he would finish in the top-15 in both dirt events, and in 2006, he would finish 11th at the Illinois State Fairgrounds Racetrack. In the following year, he would earn his first top-10 at Springfield, finishing in sixth place, and in the following year, he would finish in the top-10 in both events, finishing in ninth and seventh at Springfield and DuQuoin respectively. In 2009, would get a best finish of 12th at Springfield, before he would finish in the top-10 in both events again in the following year, running in the No. 17 that year. He would finish sixth at Springfield in 2011, and would go on to earn his first top-5 in ARCA competition, finishing fourth at DuQuoin.

In 2012, Kovski switched to Allgaier Motorsports, a team that had won the series championship with Justin Allgaier in 2008. He would start off his tenure with the team by finishing fourth at Springfield in their first race together in the No. 99 Chevrolet. For 2013, he would make his first asphalt race at Toledo Speedway, where he would start 26th, and finish ninth. He would also finish tenth at Berlin Raceway before returning to the dirt events, where he would finish 13th at Springfield and eighth at DuQuoin. In 2014, he would delve into a career as a crew chief, working with Team BCR and No. 90 Ford for Grant Enfinger. He would also make starts at the dirt tracks, finishing sixth at Springfield, and finishing 26th due to an engine issue at DuQuoin. He would move with Enfinger to GMS Racing midway through 2014, and would move to the No. 23 Chevrolet in 2015, a year year Enfinger would win the championship. Kovski would finish third at Springfield. In 2016, he would earn his best finish of second place behind Tom Hessert III at DuQuoin.

In 2017, Kovski would suffer an accident at a sprint car race at Volusia County Speedway, where he would be struck in the pits by a flipping sprint car. His injuries were significant enough that he would skip both the ARCA dirt races as a driver. He would serve as the crew chief for Enfinger in the No. 16 Chevrolet at Springfield, a race where Enfinger would win.

Kovski would return to driving duties the following year in 2018, and would finish eighth and seventh at Springfield and DuQuoin respectively. In 2019, he would get his first top-5 since 2016, finishing fifth at DuQuoin, and in his only race of 2020, he would finish fifth at Springfield. In the following year at DuQuoin, Kovski would not start the race and would be classified in 16th position. In 2022, he would finish 15th at Springfield due to an engine failure, and tenth at DuQuoin due to suspension issues.

Motorsports results

ARCA Menards Series 
(key) (Bold – Pole position awarded by qualifying time. Italics – Pole position earned by points standings or practice time. * – Most laps led.)

References

1981 births
Living people
NASCAR drivers
ARCA Menards Series drivers
Racing drivers from Illinois
Sportspeople from Springfield, Illinois